James Nsaba Buturo is a Ugandan politician. He was the Minister of State for Ethics & Integrity in the Office of the Vice President in the Cabinet of Uganda from 1 June 2006 until his resignation on 15 March 2011. In the cabinet reshuffle of 27 May 2011, his docket was assigned to Father Simon Lokodo. He also served as the elected Member of Parliament representing "Bufumbira County East", Kisoro District, from 2001 until 2011. In the 2011 national elections, Nsaba Buturo lost in the primaries to Wagahugu Kwizera of the National Resistance Movement political party, who is the incumbent MP for that constituency. Nsaba Buturo insisted on contesting the general elections as an Independent candidate; but he still lost.

Background and education
He was born in Kisoro District, on 18 March 1951. He holds the degree of Bachelor of Arts in political science and public administration, from Makerere University, Uganda's oldest institution of tertiary education, founded in 1922. He also holds a postgraduate Diploma in Developmental Administration, also from Makerere. His degree of Master of Arts in Developmental Administration was received from the University of Birmingham in the United Kingdom. He then followed up with the degree of Doctor of Philosophy in the same field, also at Birmingham.

Career
From 1977 until 1986, he served as a District Commissioner in the Ministry of Local Government. He then emigrated to the United Kingdom, where he served as a Development Manager, from 1989 until 1995. In 1999 he returned to Uganda and was appointed Director of Planning & Monitoring for in the Uganda AIDS Commission, serving in that capacity until 2001.

In 2001, he entered politics and was elected to the Ugandan Parliament, to represent "Bufumbira County East", Kisoro District. He was re-elected in 2006. From 2001 to 2006, he served as the State Minister for Information & Broadcasting. He was retained as State Minister for Information in the cabinet reshuffle of 13 January 2005. In another cabinet reshuffle in June 2006, he was appointed State Minister for Ethics in the Office of the Vice President. In March 2011, he lost his parliamentary seat and resigned from the cabinet.

Personal information
James Nsaba Buturo is married to Edith Buturo. He belongs to the National Resistance Movement political party. He is reported to have special interest in reading and politics.

See also
 Parliament of Uganda
 Cabinet of Uganda
 Kisoro District

References

External links
 Website of the Parliament of Uganda
 Website of the State House of Uganda
 Full Ministerial Cabinet List, June 2006
 Full Ministerial Cabinet List, February 2009
Full Ministerial Cabinet List, May 2011
Hate Begets Hate

1951 births
Living people
Makerere University alumni
Alumni of the University of Birmingham
People educated at Ntare School
National Resistance Movement politicians
Members of the Parliament of Uganda
Government ministers of Uganda
People from Kisoro District
People from Western Region, Uganda
21st-century Ugandan politicians